So Cool may refer to:

 So Cool (band), a Thai rock band
 So Cool (Sistar album), 2011
 So Cool (Take 6 album), 1998

pt:So Cool